Coleophora pauperculella is a moth of the family Coleophoridae that can be found in Irkutsk, eastern Siberia, Russia.

References

External links

strigiferella
Endemic fauna of Russia
Moths described in 1884
Moths of Asia